The University of the People (UoPeople) is a non-profit private, distance education university.

History
University of the People was launched by educational entrepreneur Shai Reshef in January 2009. Although the university has no campus due to its online distance learning nature, it uses a shared office in California as an office of admission.

The first UoPeople students began classes in September 2009, studying for associate and bachelor's degrees in business administration and computer science. At that time, the school had no accreditation and did not charge any fees or tuition.

In February 2012, the Bill & Melinda Gates Foundation awarded the University of the People a grant of $613,282 for the purpose of helping the university earn national accreditation. Two years later, the university was accredited for degree-granting programs through the Distance Education Accrediting Commission (DEAC).

In 2016, the university began offering an online MBA.

In 2017, the University of Edinburgh partnered with the school so that Health Science graduates of the University of the People could complete a bachelor's at UE.

In 2018, the university announced the new online Master of Education in Advanced Teaching in collaboration with the International Baccalaureate. This new program started taking in students in 2019. IB started to offer 80 scholarships for eligible M.Ed. students in 2020.

UoPeople in Arabic, announced in the World Economic Forum in April 2019, launched in September 2020 with its own website in Arabic; it uses a different website in Arabic and does not require proof of English knowledge while issuing American degrees. 

In 2020, the University became a member of UNESCO global education coalition.

University of the People received candidate status in June 2021 with WASC Senior College and University Commission which is a regional accrediting body; WASC states that "Candidacy indicates that the institution meets all or nearly all the Standards at a minimum level. Candidacy is not accreditation and does not ensure eventual accreditation".

Facilities

University of the People Education Ltd is a wholly owned subsidiary which provides support services to the institution. The subsidiary is registered with the Israeli Corporations Authority and maintains an office in Tel Aviv, Israel.

Degree Programs Available
 Associate of Science in Health Science
 Associate of Science in Business Administration
 Associate of Science in Computer Science
 Bachelor of Science in Health Science
 Bachelor of Science in Business Administration
 Bachelor of Science in Computer Science
 Master of Business Administration (MBA)
 Master of Education in Advanced Teaching (M.Ed.)
 Master of Science in Information Technology (MSIT)

Fees
According to University of the People they charge no tuition fees but students must pay some administrative fees to cover course assessments, ranging from $2,460 for an associate's degree (two years) to $4,860 for a bachelor's degree (four years). These include processing fees for applications and final exam assessments.

The university does not participate in federal financial aid programs, but it does offer scholarships to eligible students.

Notes

References

External links